York and Yorke are surnames and may refer to:

York
 Alexander M. York (1838–1928), American politician
 Alissa York (born 1970), Canadian writer
 Alvin C. York (1887–1964), American war hero
 Andrew York (born 1958), American guitarist
 Andy York (1894–1977), British football player
 Byron York (born 1958), American author and journalist
 Cade York (born 2001), American football player
 Cameron York (born 2001), American ice hockey player
 Carol Beach York (1928–2013), American children's author
 Christian York (born 1977), American professional wrestler
 Chris York (born 1989), English rugby union player
 Christopher York (1909–1999), British politician
 Colin York (1904–1973), Australian rugby league player
 Deborah York (born 1964), British singer
 Dick York (1928–1992), American actor
 Dolores Crow (née York; 1931–2018), American legislator
 Dwight York (born 1945), American criminal, author and musician
 Dwight York, stand-up comedian
 Dwight A. York (born 1939), Wisconsin politician
 Ernest York (–1917), English footballer
 E. T. York (1922–2011), American university president
 Francine York (1936–2017), American actress
 Gabe York (born 1993), American basketball player for Hapoel Tel Aviv of the Israeli Basketball Premier League
 Harry York (born 1974), Canadian ice hockey player
 Herbert York (1921–2009), American physicist
 James W. York (born 1939), American mathematical physicist
 James Warren York (1839–1927), American musical instrument innovator
 Jason York (born 1970), Canadian ice hockey player
 Jerry York (born 1945), American hockey coach
 Jerry York (businessman) (1938–2010), American businessman
 John York (born 1949), American businessman
 John York (died 1569), English merchant
 John J. York (born 1958), American actor
 Jones Orin York (1893–1970), American spy for Russia
 Justin York (born 1983), American guitarist
 Kathleen York, American actress and singer-songwriter
 Keith York, English drummer
 Melissa York (born 1969), American drummer
 Michael York (actor) (born 1942), British actor
 Michael York (field hockey player) (born 1967), Australian field hockey player
 Mike York (born 1978), American ice hockey player
 Morgan York (born 1993), American actress
 Myrth York (born 1946), American politician
 Peter York (born 1944), British management consultant, author and broadcaster
 Rachel York (born 1971), American actress and singer
 Roy E. York (1879-1955), American farmer and politician
 Rudy York (1913–1970), American baseball player
 Russell J. York (1921–2006), American war hero
 Rusty York (1935–2014), American singer
 Sarah York (born 1978), American pen-pal of Manuel Noriega
 Steve York (born 1943), American documentary filmmaker
 J. Steven York (born 1957), American writer
 Susan York, American artist
 Susannah York (1939–2011), British actress
 Teri York (born 1955), Canadian diver
 Tony York (1912–1970), American baseball player
 Tyre York (1836–1916), American politician
 William Herbert York (1918–2004), American musician
 York (explorer) (1770–1831), American slave who served with the Lewis and Clark Expedition

Yorke

People
Andy Yorke (born 1972), British musician
Barbara Yorke (born 1951), British historian
Charles Philip Yorke (1764–1834), British politician
Charles Yorke, 4th Earl of Hardwicke (1799–1873), British politician
Charles Yorke (1722–1770), British lawyer and politician
Charles Yorke (British Army officer) (1790–1880), British soldier
Clint Yorke, Tobagoan cricketer
Dwight Yorke (born 1971), Trinidad and Tobago football player
Edith Yorke (1867–1934), British actress
Elenor Yorke (1911–1983), American author
Henry Yorke (priest) (1803–1871), Archdeacon of Huntington
Henry Redhead Yorke (1772–1813), English writer and radical publicist
Henry Vincent Yorke (1905–1973), British author
James A. Yorke (born 1941), American mathematician
John Yorke (disambiguation), several people
Joseph Sydney Yorke (1768–1831), British admiral
Margaret Yorke (pseudonym of Margaret Beda Nicholson; 1924–2012), British author
Michael Yorke (1939–2019), Anglican priest
Nick Yorke (born 2002), American baseball player
Philip Yorke, 1st Earl of Hardwicke (1690–1764), British lawyer and politician
Philip Yorke, 2nd Earl of Hardwicke (1720–1790), British politician
Philip Yorke, 3rd Earl of Hardwicke (1757–1834), British politician
Thomas Yorke (disambiguation), several people

Characters
Hal Yorke, fictional vampire in the British TV Series Being Human
J.T. Yorke, a fictional character in Degrassi: The Next Generation

English toponymic surnames